Hirschberg may refer to:

Places 
 Hirschberg, Rhineland-Palatinate, a municipality in the district of Rhein-Lahn, Rhineland-Palatinate, Germany
 Hirschberg, Thuringia, a town in the district of Saale-Orla-Kreis, Thuringia, Germany
 Hirschberg an der Bergstraße, a town in the district of Rhein-Neckar, Baden-Württemberg, Germany
 Hirschberg, a former municipality in Switzerland, now incorporated into Oberegg District in the canton of Appenzell Innerrhoden
 Hirschberg, a part of town of Warstein in the district of Soest, North Rhine-Westphalia, Germany
 Hirschberg (Bad Hirschberg), German name for Doksy, a town on the shores of lake Máchovo jezero
 , Weilheim in Oberbayern, Bavaria, Germany
 Hirschberger Großteich, German name for Lake Mácha, an artificial lake in the Liberec Region, Czech Republic
 Hirschberg im Riesengebirge, the historic German name for Jelenia Góra, a city in Lower Silesia, south-western Poland

Mountains and hills 
 Hirschberg (Bavaria), a mountain in the Bavarian Fore-alps south of Lake Tegernsee, Bavaria, Germany
 Hirschberg, the highest hill in the Kaufunger Wald, central Germany

People with the surname Hirschberg 
 Dan Hirschberg, computer science professor at University of California
 Eugenie Hirschberg-Pucher (1862–1937), Latvian poet and writer
 Julia Hirschberg, American computer scientist
 Julius Hirschberg (1843–1925), German ophthalmologist and medical historian
 Max Hirschberg (1883–1964), German Jewish lawyer

Other uses 
 Hirschberg test, a medical screening test for an eye condition
 Hirschberg's algorithm, a dynamic computer programming algorithm

See also
 Hirshberg, a surname